Crisis of Leadership is a term used by Trotskyists to describe the fundamental problem holding back the working class from political power in the epoch of imperialism. Trotsky argued that only Stalinists, centrists and reformists who hold the leadership of the class and its vanguard hold back the working class from political power when capitalism has reached the point that it is ready for socialism.

This is shown in a quote from Trotsky's The Death Agony of Capitalism and the Tasks of the Fourth International (1938):

"All talk to the effect that historical conditions have not yet 'ripened' for socialism is the product of ignorance or conscious deception. The objective prerequisites for the proletarian revolution have not only 'ripened'; they have begun to get somewhat rotten. Without a socialist revolution, in the next historical period at that, a catastrophe threatens the whole culture of mankind. The turn is now to the proletariat, i.e., chiefly to its revolutionary vanguard. The historical crisis of mankind is reduced to the crisis of the revolutionary leadership."

The importance of this today is the different positions held by Trotskyist groups on this question - indicating their views on programme and epoch.

Trotskyism